Achintya Holte Nilsen (born 1 January 1999) is an Indonesian-Norwegian model who was crowned Miss Indonesia 2017. She represented Indonesia at the Miss World 2017 pageant and finished as Top 10 finalists, won "Beauty with a Purpose", "Miss World Asia" and "Best Designer Award".

Early life and background

Nilsen was born in Denpasar, Bali, Indonesia, on 1 January 1999 to a Balinese mother, Ni Nyoman Parvati from Denpasar – Bali and Norwegian father, Terje Holte Nilsen from Risør, Østre Agder County - Norway. She has two younger sisters, named Gayatri Holte Nilsen and Ananda Holte Nilsen. She is the niece of Norwegian Olympic cross-country skier Elin Nilsen, and cousin of Olympic speed skater Simen Spieler Nilsen. She work as a singer and her musical instrument speciality is Marimba. Nilsen is a trilingual speaker, she is fluently speak in Norsk, English and Bahasa Indonesia.

She attended Bali International Green School (primary-secondary) and graduated in 2017 where she is also taking part as an activist on Greenpeace Indonesia, and holds a Bachelor degree of Fine Arts (BFA) in Filmmaking and Television from New York University-Tisch School of the Arts in New York City, United States. She often representing Indonesia in world forums such as Bali Model United Nations 2013-2014 and delegate of Indonesia for Taiwan Model United Nations 2015.

Pageantry

Miss Indonesia 2017
Nilsen starting her foray into the world of pageantry began in 2017 when she competed at the 13th edition of Miss Indonesia national beauty pageant in Jakarta at the age of eighteen. Nilsen represented her mother home province West Nusa Tenggara on the Miss Indonesia 2017 beauty pageant, and she won Miss Indonesia 2017, beating the other 33 contestants from other provinces across Indonesia.

The grand finale of Miss Indonesia 2017 pageant was held in MNC Studio, Jakarta, Indonesia, on 22 April 2017. Nilsen was crowned by the outgoing titleholder of Miss Indonesia 2016 and the Miss World 2016 2nd Runner-up, Natasha Mannuela Halim of Bangka Belitung. The president of Miss World organization Julia Morley and Miss World 2016, Stephanie Del Valle of Puerto Rico attended the awarding night.

Her final answer on the pageant itself is praised by the current President Joko Widodo:

Nilsen ended her reign as Miss Indonesia 2017 on 22 February 2018, she crowned her successor Alya Nurshabrina Samadikun from West Java as Miss Indonesia 2018 in MNC Studio, Jakarta, Indonesia. She finished her reign at 10 months 1 week 12 days.

Miss World 2017
As Miss Indonesia 2017, Nilsen represented Indonesia at the 67th edition of the Miss World 2017 pageant held in Sanya City Arena, Sanya, China, on 18 November 2017. During the pageant, she won a Head-to-Head Challenge, beating other countries in the group with her Olympic rings answer.

At the Finale, Nilsen was placed in the Top 10 finalists and was also declared as the winner of "Beauty with a Purpose", Miss World Asia and "Best Designer Award" in the pageant. Stephanie Del Valle of Puerto Rico crowned Manushi Chhillar of India as the new titleholder at the end of the event.

Famous Relatives
Elin Nilsen (aunt): Norwegian three-time Olympic silver medallists cross-country skier.
Simen Spieler Nilsen (cousin): Norwegian Olympic gold medallist speed skater.

References

External links

 
 Achintya Holte Nilsen Official Website
 Achintya Holte Nilsen Official Youtube Channel

1999 births
Living people
Indo people
Balinese people
New York University alumni
Tisch School of the Arts alumni
Miss Indonesia winners
Puteri Indonesia winners
Indonesian beauty pageant winners
Indonesian female models
Indonesian activists
Indonesian Christians
Indonesian people of Norwegian descent
Health activists
People associated with Greenpeace
Elder rights activists
People from Denpasar
People from Bali
Miss World 2017 delegates